Chocolate City is a 2015 American comedy-drama film directed and written by filmmaker Jean-Claude La Marre. The film stars Robert Ri'chard, Michael Jai White, Carmen Electra and Vivica A. Fox. The plot is about the life for a struggling college student changes in an instant when he meets the owner of a male strip club who convinces him to give amateur night a whirl. This film was shot in Inglewood, California and was released in a limited release and through video on demand outlets on May 22, 2015.

A 2017 sequel named Chocolate City: Vegas Strip is available on Netflix.

Synopsis
Michael (Robert Ri'chard) a college student takes a job as an exotic dancer to make ends meet, and as the money rolls in, he has to deal with the attention of the female club goers while hiding his job from his mother (Vivica A. Fox) and girlfriend (Imani Hakim).

Cast

 Robert Ri'chard as Michael McCoy
 Vivica Fox as Katherine McCoy
 DeRay Davis as Chris McCoy
 Michael Jai White as Princeton
 Tyson Beckford as Adrian "Rude Boy"
 Darrin Dewitt Henson as Magnus
 Jean-Claude La Marre as Pastor Jones
 Ginuwine as Pharaoh
 Ernest Thomas as Diner Manager
 Carmen Electra as DJ
 Eurika Pratts as DeDe
 Andrea Kelly as Dance Instructor
 Xavier Declie as Professor Lyons
 Michael Bolwaire as Bolo
 Gibert Salvidar as Slayer
 Danny Mitchell as Jamaika
 Brian Massey as Addiction
 Aaron McNeal as Smoove
 Carlito Olivero as Raphael
 Maliah Michel as Kandi
 Candice Craig as Cynthia
 Johann J. Jean as Bartender
 Cydney Davis as Sister Beatrice
 Trae Ireland as Wade
 Imani Hakim as Carmen
 Jah Shams as D. Ice

Production
The film is a black version of the 2012 male stripper movie, Magic Mike, starring Channing Tatum. According to the film's director, Jean-Claude La Marre, "There was one glaring omission in Magic Mike, and that was people of color.  We figured that was a missed opportunity for them and we jumped on it."

Release
In the United States, the film was released in a limited release and through video on demand on May 22, 2015. Freestyle Releasing handled the theatrical release with Paramount Home Entertainment handling the video on demand and home media release of the film. The film also debuted on BET on June 10, 2015. It had 991,000 viewers in its first airing.

Marketing
On April 24, 2015, the official trailer and poster were released.

Sequel
A sequel named Chocolate City: Vegas was released to BET on July 1, 2017. On August 12, 2017, it was added to Netflix behind the name Chocolate City: Vegas Strip.

See also
List of black films of the 2010s
 Dreamboys
 Australia's Thunder from Down Under
 Magic Mike
 Chippendales

References

External links
 
 
 

2015 films
2015 comedy-drama films
American comedy-drama films
2010s English-language films
Films set in California
Films shot in California
African-American films
Films directed by Jean-Claude La Marre
Films about striptease
2010s American films